Park City Group, Inc. was established in 1990 and is headquartered in Salt Lake City, Utah. The company focuses on software-as-a-service (SaaS) for the suppliers and retailers in the whole supply chain, reducing out-of-stocks, optimizing inventory, and improving profits and operational efficiencies. In 2009, the company acquired Prescient Applied Intelligence to form "the New" Park City Group. In 2013, the company moved trading in its shares from the NYSE, formerly the American Stock Exchange, to the NASDAQ Capital Market.

History 

In the 1970s, Randall Fields established a Palo Alto based consulting firm named "Fields Investment Group." The company moved its headquarters to Park City in 1982.

Products and services 

Products include Store Level Replenishment, which provides visibility to store level activity; ResposiTrak, which traces products in supply chain; and ActionManager, an automated method to manage the business process. In addition, the company provides consulting for business optimization, technical services, and training.

Awards 
In 2013, Park City Group was ranked 381st on Deloitte Fast 500 for companies in the field of technology, media, telecommunications, life sciences and clean technology in North America.

References

External links 
 Official Website

Companies established in 2002
Companies listed on the Nasdaq